Raoul Albin Louis Salan (10 June 1899 – 3 July 1984) was a French Army general. He served as the fourth French commanding general during the First Indochina War. He was one of four retired generals who organized the 1961 Algiers Putsch operation. He was the founder of the Organisation armée secrète and the most decorated soldier in the French Army at the end of his military career.

World War I

Salan was born on 10 June 1899 in Roquecourbe, Tarn. Enlisted in the French Army for the duration of the war on 2 August 1917, he was accepted in the École spéciale militaire de Saint-Cyr on 21 August 1917, being assigned to the cadet student platoon of the 16th Infantry Regiment stationed at Montbrison, as part of the promotion "de Saint-Odile et de La Fayette" (1917-1918). Salan graduated as an aspirant on 25 July 1918, and was assigned to the 5th Colonial Infantry Regiment (5e RIC) in Lyon on 14 August 1918.

As a platoon leader in the 5e RIC's 11e Compagnie, he took part in the fighting in the Verdun region (Saint-Mihiel, Les Éparges, Fort de Bois-Bourru, Côte de Oie, Cumières-le-Mort-Homme). He was mentioned in the Order of the Brigade by Order dated 29 December 1918.

World War II

Until France's surrender in World War II, Colonel Salan commanded a battalion of Senegalese troops. At first he sided with the Vichy Government, but when the tide turned to the Allied side, he campaigned hard and successfully in southern France with General Jean de Lattre de Tassigny's troops. 
Between the world wars he was attached in various capacities to the Ministry of Colonies, and in 1941–43 he served with the Free French forces in French West Africa. After participating in the Allied invasion of France in 1944, he went to Indochina in 1945 and was commander in chief there during 1952–53.

Indochina and Algeria
Salan served as the commander of French forces in Vietnam from 1945 to 1947. By 1948, he was commander of all French land forces in East Asia, and after the death of Jean de Lattre de Tassigny in 1952, Salan became the commander-in-chief in Indochina.

Salan served as commander-in-chief of French forces in French Algeria in 1956. In 1958, Salan called for the return to power of Charles De Gaulle, believing that the latter would protect French Algeria. He retired shortly after, first moving to Spain, then to mainland France. He was banned from entering Algeria in 1960.

Nevertheless, Salan returned to Algeria to organize the putsch on 21 April 1961 with André Zeller, Edmond Jouhaud and Maurice Challe. After the failure of the putsch, he became the chief of Organisation armée secrète (OAS), which attempted to disrupt the April 1962 Peace Evian Accords. He was arrested in April 1962.

Salan was charged with treason and condemned in absentia to death. Then, in April 1962, he was arrested in Algiers. The death sentence on him was commuted to life imprisonment. He was pardoned in 1968.

Death

Salan died on 3 July 1984. Every year, former members of the OAS bring flowers to his tomb on his death anniversary.

Decorations
Salan was the most decorated soldier in the French Army.

French and Colonial Decorations
Légion d'honneur
Knight (5 April 1922)
Officer (21 August 1940)
Commander (10 February 1945)
Grand Officer (27 October 1948)
Grand Cross (28 August 1952)
Médaille militaire (12 July 1958)
Croix de guerre 1914-1918 (1 citation)
Croix de guerre 1939-1945 (8 citations)
Croix de guerre des Théatres d'Opérations Exterieures (7 citations)
Croix de la Valeur Militaire (1 citation)
Volunteer combatant's cross
Combatant's Cross
Colonial Medal (Far East clasp)
Grand Cross of the Order of the Black Star
(with GC rosette)Grand Cordon of the Order of the Dragon of Annam with Military and Civil title
Officer and (later)Grand Cross of the Royal Order of Cambodia
Grand Cross of the Order of the Million Elephants and the White Parasol
Grand Cross of the Tai Order of Civil Merit (Sip Song Chau Tai)
Grand Cross of the Order of Glory (Tunisia)
Grand Cordon of the Order of Ouissam Alaouite
Grand Cross of the Order of the Star of Anjouan
Grand Cross of the Étoile des Comores
Royal Order of Monisaraphon
Gallantry Cross (South Vietnam), with palm
National Defense Medal (Cambodia)
Syria-Cilicia commemorative medal
 Order of Civil Merit of the Syrian Arab Republic
Médaille Interalliée de la Victoire
Médaille commémorative de la guerre 1914–1918
Médaille commémorative de la guerre 1939–1945 with clasps "Africa", "Italy", "France", "Germany"
Médaille de l'Aéronautique
Medal for the War Wounded
Annam Order of Military Merit 
Order of the Reign of King Savang Vatthana
Médaille commémorative de la campagne d'Italie 1943-1944
Médaille commémorative de la campagne d'Indochine
Médaille Commémorative des Opérations de Sécurité et de Maintien de l'Ordre en Afrique du Nord with "Algeria" clasp

Foreign Decorations
Distinguished Service Cross (US)
Commander of the Order of the British Empire (CBE) (UK)
Vietnam Campaign Medal (Thailand)
Sena Jayaseddh Medal(Cambodia)

Bibliography
Mémoires Fin d’un empire (4 volumes), Editions Presses de la Cité, 1970–74
Le sens d’ un engagement, 1970
Le Viêt-minh mon adversaire, 1971
Algérie française, 1972
L'Algérie de Gaulle et moi, 1974

References

Further reading
 Alexander, Martin S., and John FV Keiger, eds. France and the Algerian War, 1954-1962: Strategy, Operations and Diplomacy (Routledge, 2013)
General Paul Aussaresses, The Battle of the Casbah: Terrorism and Counter-Terrorism in Algeria, 1955-1957. (New York: Enigma Books, 2010) .

External links
  Association of Friends of Raoul Salan
  Raoul Salan, a colonial General by Madeleine Rebérioux
 BBC article on Salan's 1962 sentencing

1899 births
1984 deaths
People from Tarn (department)
French generals
French military personnel of World War I
French military personnel of World War II
French military personnel of the First Indochina War
French military personnel of the Algerian War
Members of the Organisation armée secrète
People sentenced to death in absentia
École Spéciale Militaire de Saint-Cyr alumni
Order of the Francisque recipients
Knights Grand Cross of the Royal Order of Cambodia
Grand Croix of the Légion d'honneur
Recipients of the Croix de Guerre 1914–1918 (France)
Recipients of the Croix de Guerre 1939–1945 (France)
Recipients of the Distinguished Service Cross (United States)
Recipients of the Croix de guerre des théâtres d'opérations extérieures
Recipients of the Cross for Military Valour
Recipients of the Aeronautical Medal
Honorary Commanders of the Order of the British Empire
Governors of Cochinchina